Household Ghosts is a 1961 novel by the British writer James Kennaway. It portrays the intense relationship between a brother and sister, members of a declining upper-class family in rural Perthshire.

Adaptation
In 1970 it was made into the film Country Dance directed by J. Lee Thompson and starring Peter O'Toole and Susannah York.

References

Bibliography
 Goble, Alan. The Complete Index to Literary Sources in Film. Walter de Gruyter, 1999.
 Watson, Roderick. The Literature of Scotland: The Twentieth Century. Macmillan, 2006.

1961 British novels
Novels by James Kennaway
British novels adapted into films
Scottish novels
Novels set in Scotland
Longman books